Morgantown Lock and Dam is a navigational lock and a gated dam on the Monongahela River at Morgantown, West Virginia.  It is part of a series of dams that canalizes the Monongahela to a depth of at least  for its entire length from Fairmont, West Virginia to Pittsburgh, Pennsylvania.  It is maintained by the U.S. Army Corps of Engineers' Pittsburgh District.

Morgantown has a single lock chamber located on the left-descending river bank.

History
Construction on Morgantown Lock and Dam began in 1948 and was completed in 1950.  It replaced old Locks 10 and 11, timber crib structures installed in 1897–1903.

See also
List of crossings of the Monongahela River

References

External links
Morgantown Lock and Dam

Transportation in Monongalia County, West Virginia
Buildings and structures in Morgantown, West Virginia
Dams in West Virginia
Water transportation in West Virginia
Crossings of the Monongahela River
United States Army Corps of Engineers, Pittsburgh District
United States Army Corps of Engineers dams
Dams completed in 1950
Locks of West Virginia